Shiren may refer to:

Shi Ren, an official in the late Eastern Han dynasty
Kokan Shiren, a 14th-century Japanese Zen patriarch and poet
Mount Yao, formerly Mount Shiren, in Henan, China

See also 

 Shiren the Wanderer, a video game series